The Tangipahoa African American Heritage Museum & Veterans Archives is a museum on Phoenix Square in Hammond, Louisiana.

There are three main buildings. The north building has a dinner theater and storage. The middle building contains the main displays of African American heritage. The south building offers a spacious banquet hall together with multi-purpose conference facilities. The Museum is one of 26 sites on the Louisiana African American Heritage Trail, as cited by USA Today.

The Museum originated in the 1980s and has incrementally expanded in both displays and community services. A special arena of concentration in the Museum is its collection of data and exhibits on African American veterans of military service. The Museum has a Cooperative Endeavor Agreement with Southeastern Louisiana University.

See also
List of museums focused on African Americans

References

External links
 Tangipahoa African American Heritage Museum - official site

African-American museums in Louisiana
Buffalo Soldiers
History museums in Louisiana
Louisiana African American Heritage Trail
Military and war museums in Louisiana
Museums in Tangipahoa Parish, Louisiana
Hammond, Louisiana
Tourist attractions in Tangipahoa Parish, Louisiana